The Perfect House is a 2011 American horror film directed by Kris Hulbert and Randy Kent. The film starring Felissa Rose, Jonathan Tiersten, John Philbin, Dustin Stevens, Monique Parent and Andrea Vahl in the lead roles.

Premise
A young couple's dream home turns into a house of horrors when the disturbing, violent acts of three generations of doomed families is reawakened for them to witness.

Cast
 Felissa Rose as Mother
 Jonathan Tiersten as John Doesy
 John Philbin as Jeff
 Dustin Stevens as The Stranger
 Monique Parent as Real Estate Agent
 Andrea Vahl as Marisol
 William A. Robertson as Mike
 Alan Kroll as Gus
 Chris Raab as Steve
 Kris Smith as Storm Mother
 Timothy Dugan as Storm Father
 Alex Victoria as Storm Daughter
 Michael Wagner as Storm Son
 Holly Greene as Female Cage Victim
 Hans Hernke as Male Cage Victim
 Angelina Leigh as Female Victim
 Becky Friedman as Distraught Mother

References

External links
 
 

2011 films
2011 horror films
American horror anthology films
Fratricide in fiction
2010s English-language films
2010s American films